The LEN Champions League Women, formerly known as LEN European Cup (from 1987 to 1999), LEN Champions Cup (from 1999 to 2013) and LEN Euroleague Women (2014 to 2022), is the premier competition for women's water polo clubs of Europe and takes place every year.

History
Created in 1987 as the women's water polo clubs continental competition, contested amongst the national champions of the European countries, it has been played under the following names:
 LEN European Cup (1987–1999)
 LEN Champions Cup (1999–2013)
 LEN Euro League Women (2014–2022)
 LEN Champions League Women (since 2023)

Format
Over the years, different formats have been used in the competition, either Round-robin or Knockout or both combined (round-robin at early stages and knockout at final stages).
Since the 2007–08 season, the competition has been played in four stages (qualification round, preliminary round, quarter final round and final four).

Title holders

 1987–88:  Donk Gouda
 1988–89:  Donk Gouda
 1989–90:  Nereus
 1990–91:  Donk Gouda
 1991–92:  Brandenburg
 1992–93:  Szentes
 1993–94:  Orizzonte Catania
 1994–95:  Nereus
 1995–96:  Nereus
 1996–97:  SKIF Moscow
 1997–98:  Orizzonte Catania
 1998–99:  SKIF Moscow
 1999–00:  Glyfada
 2000–01:  Orizzonte Catania
 2001–02:  Orizzonte Catania
 2002–03:  Glyfada
 2003–04:  Orizzonte Catania
 2004–05:  Orizzonte Catania
 2005–06:  Orizzonte Catania
 2006–07:  Fiorentina
 2007–08:  Orizzonte Catania
 2008–09:  Vouliagmeni
 2009–10:  Vouliagmeni
 2010–11:  Astralpool Sabadell
 2011–12:  Pro Recco
 2012–13:  Astralpool Sabadell
 2013–14:  Astralpool Sabadell
 2014–15:  Olympiacos
 2015–16:  Astralpool Sabadell
 2016–17:  Kinef Kirishi
 2017–18:  Kinef Kirishi
 2018–19:  Astralpool Sabadell
 2019–20: Cancelled due to COVID-19 pandemic
 2020–21:  Olympiacos
 2021–22:  Olympiacos

Finals

Source: LEN (from 1987 to 2016).

Titles by club

Titles by nation

References

 
Recurring sporting events established in 1987
Women
Women's water polo competitions
Multi-national professional sports leagues